The 2013–14 Milwaukee Panthers men's basketball team represented the University of Wisconsin–Milwaukee during the 2013–14 NCAA Division I men's basketball season. The Panthers, led by head coach Rob Jeter, played their home games at the U.S. Cellular Arena and Klotsche Center and were members of the Horizon League. They finished the season 21–14, 7–9 in Horizon League play to finish in a tie for fifth place. They were champions of the Horizon League tournament to earn an automatic bid to the NCAA tournament where they lost in the second round to Villanova.

Roster

Schedule
All conference games aired on the Horizon League website

|-
!colspan=9 style="background:#000000; color:#FDBB30;"| Regular season

|-
!colspan=9 style="background:#000000; color:#FDBB30;"| Horizon League tournament

|-
!colspan=9 style="background:#000000; color:#FDBB30;"| NCAA tournament

|-

References

Milwaukee
Milwaukee Panthers men's basketball seasons
Milwaukee